Shrine Exposition Hall, Los Angeles, CA 11/10/1967 is a live album by the rock band the Grateful Dead.  A three-disc vinyl LP, it contains the complete concert recorded on November 10, 1967 at the Shrine Exposition Hall in Los Angeles, California.  It was released by Rhino Records in January 2016, in a limited edition of 6,700 copies. Unlike Dick's Picks, Road Trips, Dave's Picks, and certain other of the band's archival series of live album releases, which are simply two-track stereo recordings made from the soundboard during the concert, the show on the album was recorded on an 8-track multitrack recorder and was mixed down to stereo just prior to the album's release.

The same concert recording was also released as part of the 30 Trips Around the Sun box set in October 2015.

Track listing
Disc 1, side A
"Viola Lee Blues" (Noah Lewis)
"It Hurts Me Too" (Elmore James)
Disc 1, side B
"Beat It On Down the Line" (Jesse Fuller)
"Morning Dew" (Bonnie Dobson, Tim Rose)
"Good Morning Little Schoolgirl" (Sonny Boy Williamson)
Disc 2, side A
"That's It for the Other One"
"Cryptical Envelopment" (Jerry Garcia)
"The Other One" (Bill Kreutzmann, Bob Weir)
"Cryptical Envelopment" reprise (Garcia)
Disc 2, side B
"New Potato Caboose" (Phil Lesh, Robert Petersen)
Disc 3, side A
"Alligator" (Lesh, Ron McKernan, Robert Hunter)
"Caution (Do Not Stop on Tracks)" part 1 (Garcia, Kreutzmann, Lesh, McKernan, Weir)
Disc 3, side B
"Caution (Do Not Stop on Tracks)" part 2 (Garcia, Kreutzmann, Lesh, McKernan, Weir)

Personnel
Grateful Dead
Jerry Garcia – guitar, vocals
Mickey Hart – drums
Bill Kreutzmann – drums
Phil Lesh – bass, vocals
Ron "Pigpen" McKernan – organ, harmonica, percussion, vocals
Bob Weir – guitar, vocals

Production
Produced by Grateful Dead
Produced for release by David Lemieux
Recording: Dan Healy
Mixing: Jeffrey Norman
Mastering: Jeffrey Norman, David Glasser

References

Grateful Dead live albums
2016 live albums
Rhino Entertainment live albums